Indian celery is a common name for several plants and may refer to:

Heracleum maximum, native to North America
Lomatium nudicaule, native to western North America
Seseli diffusum, native to India

See also
Wild celery